Sir Robert Lewis Fullarton Boyd (19 October 1922 – 5 February 2004) was a pioneer of British space science and founding director of the Mullard Space Science Laboratory (part of University College London).

Robert Boyd was born in Saltcoats, Ayrshire - one of twin boys.  He was a pupil at Whitgift School and studied at Imperial College (BSc(Eng) 1943) and University College London (PhD 1949; Fellow 1988).

His scientific career started at the Admiralty Mining Establishment in 1943 where he
worked with some notable scientists, including Harrie Massey who would later 
encourage Boyd to engage in atmospheric physics research at UCL. His thesis was
on New Techniques for the Study of Ionised Gases.

In addition to helping create the MSSL, Boyd played an instrumental role in the founding of the European Space Research Organization and its subsequent incarnation the European Space Agency (1974/75). Boyd succeeded Harrie Massey as the chair of the British National Committee for Space Research in 1976.

He became a Fellow of the Royal Society in 1969 and was knighted in 1983 in recognition of his services to space science.

Boyd was a committed Christian and he saw no conflict but subtle complementarity between science and religion. His 1950s and 1960s writings and lectures on this relationship helped Christians to be more influential in science, through the Research Scientists' Christian Fellowship.

Career
 Experimental Officer at Admiralty Mining Establishment, 1943–46
 DSIR (UK) Research Assistant, 1946–49
 ICI Research Fellow, 1949–52
 Lecturer in Physics, UCL, 1952–58; Reader 1959-62
 Professor of Astronomy (part-time), Royal Institution, 1961–67
 Professor of Physics in the University of London, 1962–83, then Emeritus Professor
 Director, Mullard Space Science Laboratory, 1965–83.

Other activities
 Council, Physical Society, 1958–60
 Council, Royal Astronomical Society, 1962-66 (vice-president, 1964–66)
 President, Victoria Institute, 1965–76
 Governor: St Lawrence College, 1965–76
 Governor: Croydon College, 1966–80
 IEE Appleton Lecturer, 1976
 Bakerian Lecturer, Royal Society, 1978
 Halley Lecturer, University of Oxford, 1981
 Chairman: Meteorology Research Committee and Astronautics Committee, Ministry of Defence, 1972–75
 Member: BBC Science Consultative Group, 1970–79
 Science Research Council, 1977-81 (chairman, Astronomy, Space and Radio Bd, 1977–80)
 British National Committee on Space Research, 1976–87
 Governor: Southlands College, 1976–94
 Trustee, National Maritime Museum, 1980–89
 Chairman, London Bible College, 1983–90.

Honours 
 Fellow of the Royal Society, 1969
 CBE, 1972
 Honorary DSc Heriot-Watt University, 1979
 Knight, 1983

See also 
 Admiralty Mining Establishment
 Atomic physics

References

 Who's Who 2004

External links 
 Obituary from Astronomy and Geophysics (June 2004)

1922 births
2004 deaths
Academics of UCL Mullard Space Science Laboratory
Alumni of University College London
Alumni of Imperial College London
20th-century British astronomers
Fellows of the Royal Society
Knights Bachelor
People educated at Whitgift School
Scottish evangelicals
Space programme of the United Kingdom
People from Saltcoats
Admiralty personnel of World War II